Chasing Rainbows is a museum based on the country music singer Dolly Parton. It is located in the Dollywood theme park, Pigeon Forge, Tennessee, United States.

Chasing Rainbows opened in 2002 as a part of the "Adventures in Imagination" area of the Dollywood park. The building was originally built in 1996 and opened as the Silver Screen Cafe and was converted to DJ Platters in 1997. Chasing Rainbows is the second museum for Dolly at Dollywood. The original was Rags to Riches: The Dolly Parton Story, located over a pedestrian tunnel in Craftman's Valley.

Exhibits

Dolly's Friends - Several pictures of Dolly with her celebrity friends including: Cher, Jane Fonda, Lily Tomlin, Carol Burnett, Johnny Cash, and others.
Dolly's Attic - a showcase of Dolly's personal items from her history. Some items are made by fans and displayed in the room. The room is designed to look like an attic. A video plays in the room of Dolly telling stories about items in the room.
Dr. Robert F. Thomas - Contains a copy of Dolly's birth certificate and the original doctor's bag belonging to the doctor that delivered Dolly.
Tennessee Mountain Home - A replica of a cabin like the one in which Dolly grew up. This exhibit contains dolls like the one her father made for her as a child called "Little Tiny Tassletop," which was the influence for Dolly's first song written.
Coat of Many Colors - A replica of the coat that Dolly's mother made for her is displayed, next to Porter Wagoner's laundry slip (on the back of which Dolly wrote the song).
Greene's Rolling Store - A replica of a bus that traveled the area Dolly grew up is displayed.
House of Prayer - A church house is replicated, displaying objects that belonged to Dolly's grandfather Rev. Jake Owens including: a pair of glasses, a fiddle, an organ, and a family Bible.
School House - A one-room school house like Dolly attended as a child. Objects on display include love letters written to Dolly by a schoolmate, a photo of Dolly in front of the United States Capitol her senior year, and her high school band uniform.
Cas Walker Show - An area that is dedicated to Cas Walker and the show that introduced Dolly to show business.
Early Career - A copy of Dolly's first record "Puppy Love" and other objects from her start are on display.
Do You, Dolly... - A copy of Dolly's wedding certificate as well as other pictures of Dolly and her husband are displayed.
The Porter Wagoner Show - Costumes belonging to Dolly, Porter Wagoner, Speck Rhodes, and Don Warden are on display. Also on display are "Dolly Dolls" made by Ann Warden.
The Dolly Show 1970s - Costumes from that era of Dolly's life are on display as well as video footage from The Dolly TV show.
Lyrics - A collection of hand-written lyrics.
Movies - Costumes from 9 to 5, The Best Little Whorehouse in Texas, Rhinestone, Steel Magnolias, and Straight Talk are displayed.
Dolly Remembers Porter - A video of Dolly remembering Porter Wagoner is presented along with a costume belonging to Porter Wagoner.
Awards and Accomplishments - Dolly's Academy of Country Music Awards, Grammys, Country Music Association, and other awards are on display in a two-story case.
Listening Station - Listeners can listen to Dolly's music.
Videos - Viewers can select Dolly's videos.
Family and Friends - Using touch-screen, viewers can watch interviews with Dolly's family and friends.
Ask Dolly - Using touch-screen, viewers can "ask" Dolly questions.
Dolly's Closet - A display of Dolly's old stage costumes, as well as costumes from her 1980's TV show.
Wear Dolly's Wigs - Using touch-screen and cameras, viewers can put their pictures on a screen and select Dolly wig styles.
Imaginary Library - A video plays of Dolly talking about her Imagination Library program through the Dollywood Foundation. 
Dollywood - An exhibit with Dolly at various events from Dollywood.
Family Tree - Pictures of Dolly's family.
For God and Country - A room dedicated to Dolly's love for her country.
Rotating Costumes - Various display cases that showcase various costumes from Dolly's career.
Smoky Mountain Reflections - A room that is made to look like it's outside, which serves as the exit of the museum.

Dolly's Home-On-Wheels
Dolly's former tour bus is now located in front of the museum. Guests are taken on the bus and park photographers take their picture on the bus. Guests are also allowed to bring their own cameras and take their own pictures.

See also
List of Dollywood attractions
 List of music museums

References

External links 

2002 establishments in Tennessee
Parton, Dolly
Dollywood
Mass media museums in the United States
Museums established in 2002
Museums in popular culture
Museums in Sevier County, Tennessee
Music museums in Tennessee
Women's museums in the United States
Country music museums